Robert Eber is an American sound engineer. He was nominated for an Academy Award in the category Best Sound for the film A Few Good Men. He has worked on more than 80 films since 1978.

Selected filmography
 A Few Good Men (1992)

References

External links

Year of birth missing (living people)
Living people
American audio engineers